Kevin Cleary may refer to:

 Kevin F. Cleary, American sound engineer
 Kevin R. Cleary, American audio specialist